Stugudalen is a village in the municipality of Tydal in Trøndelag county, Norway. The village is located in the southeastern corner of the municipality. The village is primarily a tourist area with many summer cabins near the lake. The Stugudal Chapel is located in the village.

References

Villages in Trøndelag
Tydal